Inverness (from the  , meaning "Mouth of the River Ness") is a city in the Scottish Highlands. It is the administrative centre for The Highland Council and is regarded as the capital of the Highlands. Historically it served as the county town of the county of Inverness-shire. Inverness lies near two important battle sites: the 11th-century battle of Blàr nam Fèinne against Norway which took place on the Aird, and the 18th century Battle of Culloden which took place on Culloden Moor. It is the northernmost city in the United Kingdom and lies within the Great Glen (Gleann Mòr) at its northeastern extremity where the River Ness enters the Beauly Firth. At the latest, a settlement was established by the 6th century with the first royal charter being granted by Dabíd mac Maíl Choluim (King David I) in the 12th century. Inverness and Inverness-shire are closely linked to various influential clans, including Clan Mackintosh, Clan Fraser and Clan MacKenzie.

The population of Inverness grew from 40,969 in 2001 to 46,969 in 2012, according to World Population Review. The Greater Inverness area, including Culloden and Westhill, had a population of 56,969 in 2012. In 2016, it had a population of 63,320. Inverness is one of Europe's fastest growing cities, with a quarter of the Highland population living in or around it, and is ranked fifth out of 189 British cities for its quality of life, the highest of any Scottish city.  Inverness is twinned with one German city, Augsburg, and two French towns, La Baule and Saint-Valery-en-Caux.

In 2014, a survey by a property website described Inverness as the happiest place in Scotland and the second-happiest in the UK. Inverness was again found to be the happiest place in Scotland by a new study conducted in 2015.

Prehistory and archaeology 
Much of what is known about Inverness's prehistory comes from archeological work that takes place before construction/development work as part of the planning process.

Between 2009–2010, archaeological work in advance of the creation of flood defences to the south of the city at Knocknagael Farm by GUARD archaeology discovered an archaeological site that showed humans had been living in the Inverness area from at least 6500 BC, the Late Mesolithic period. That same site showed people living/working in the area from the mid-7th millennium BC into the Late Iron Age (1st  millennium  AD) with most activity taking place in the Early Neolithic (4th millennium BC). The archaeologists also found a piece of flint from Yorkshire that showed that people in Inverness may have been trading with Yorkshire during the Neolithic.

Between 1996–1997, CFA Archaeology (then part of the University of Edinburgh) undertook excavations of crop marks in the west of Inverness in advance of the construction of a retail and business park. A Bronze Age cemetery was discovered in 1996 and in 1997 the archaeologists found the remains of a Bronze Age settlement and a Iron Age settlement, with an ironsmith. It is one the earliest examples of Iron Smithing in Scotland. The Iron Age settlement had Roman brooches from the AD 1st–2nd centuries, indicating trade with the Roman Empire. Similarly, the Bronze Age site showed signs of metal production: finds included ceramic piece-moulds designed for the casting of Late Bronze Age leaf-shaped swords. A 93 oz (2.9 kg) silver chain dating to AD 500–800 was found just to the south of Torvean in 1983.

History

Picts 
Inverness was one of the chief strongholds of the Picts, and in AD 569 was visited by St Columba with the intention of converting the Pictish king Brude, who is supposed to have resided in the vitrified fort on Craig Phadrig, on the western edge of the city. A church or a monk's cell is thought to have been established by early Celtic monks on St Michael's Mount, a mound close to the river, now the site of the Old High Church and graveyard.

Medieval 
The first royal charter being granted by Dabíd mac Maíl Choluim (King David I) in the 12th century. The Gaelic king Mac Bethad Mac Findláich (MacBeth) whose 11th-century killing of King Duncan was immortalised in Shakespeare's largely fictionalised play Macbeth, held a castle within the city where he ruled as Mormaer of Moray and Ross.

Inverness Castle is said to have been built by Máel Coluim III (Malcolm III) of Scotland, after he had razed to the ground the castle in which Mac Bethad mac Findláich had, according to much later tradition, murdered Máel Coluim's father Donnchad (Duncan I), and which stood on a hill around 1 km to the north-east.

The strategic location of Inverness has led to many conflicts in the area. Reputedly there was a battle in the early 11th century between Malcolm III and Thorfinn the Mighty at Blar Nam Feinne, to the southwest of the city.

Inverness had four traditional fairs, including Legavrik or "Leth-Gheamhradh", meaning midwinter, and Faoilleach. William the Lion (d. 1214) granted Inverness four charters, by one of which it was created a royal burgh. Of the Dominican friary founded by Alexander III in 1233, only one pillar and a worn knight's effigy survive in a secluded graveyard near the town centre.

Medieval Inverness suffered regular raids from the Western Isles, particularly by the MacDonald Lords of the Isles in the 15th century. In 1187 one Domhnall Bán (Donald Ban) led islanders in a battle at Torvean against men from Inverness Castle led by the governor's son, Donnchadh Mac An Toisich (Duncan Mackintosh). Both leaders were killed in the battle, and Donald Ban is said to have been buried in a large cairn near the river, close to where the silver chain was found. Local tradition says that the citizens fought off the Clan Donald in 1340 at the Battle of Blairnacoi on Drumderfit Hill, north of Inverness across the Beauly Firth. On his way to the Battle of Harlaw in 1411, Donald of Islay harried the city, and sixteen years later James I held a parliament in the castle to which the northern chieftains were summoned, of whom three were arrested for defying the king's command. Clan Munro defeated Clan Mackintosh in 1454 at the Battle of Clachnaharry just west of the city. Clan Donald and their allies stormed the castle during the Raid on Ross in 1491.

Post-medieval 
In 1562, during the progress undertaken to suppress Huntly's insurrection, Mary, Queen of Scots, was denied admittance into Inverness Castle by the governor, who belonged to the earl's faction, and whom she afterwards caused to be hanged. The Clan Munro and Clan Fraser of Lovat took the castle for her. The house in which she lived meanwhile stood in Bridge Street until the 1970s, when it was demolished to make way for the second Bridge Street development.

Beyond the then northern limits of the town, Oliver Cromwell built a citadel capable of accommodating 1,000 men, but with the exception of a portion of the ramparts it was demolished at the Restoration. The only surviving modern remnant is a clock tower.

Inverness played a role in the Jacobite rising of 1689. In early May, it was besieged by a contingent of Jacobites led by MacDonell of Keppoch. The town was actually rescued by Viscount Dundee, the overall Jacobite commander, when he arrived with the main Jacobite army, although he required Inverness to profess loyalty to King James VII.

18th and 19th centuries 
In 1715 the Jacobites occupied the royal fortress as a barracks. In 1727 the government built the first Fort George here, but in 1746 it surrendered to the Jacobites and they blew it up. Culloden Moor lies nearby, and was the site of the Battle of Culloden in 1746, which ended the Jacobite rising of 1745–46.

In 1783, the year that saw the end of the American Revolution and the beginning of the Highland Clearances in Inverness-shire, Cionneach MacCionnich (1758-1837), a poet from Clan MacKenzie who was born at Castle Leather near Inverness, composed the Gaelic poem The Lament of the North. In the poem, MacCionnich mocks the Highland gentry for becoming absentee landlords, evicting their tenants en masse in favor of sheep, and of "spending their wealth uselessly", in London. He accuses King George III of England both of tyranny and of steering the ship of state into shipwreck. MacCionnich also argues that truth is on the side of George Washington and the Continental Army and that the Scottish Gaels would do well to emigrate to the New World before the King and the landlords take every farthing they have left.

20th and 21st centuries 
The Rose Street drill hall was completed in around 1908.

On 7 September 1921, the first British Cabinet meeting to be held outside London took place in the Inverness Town House, when David Lloyd George, on holiday in Gairloch, called an emergency meeting to discuss the situation in Ireland. The Inverness Formula composed at this meeting was the basis of the Anglo-Irish Treaty.

Inverness has experienced rapid economic growth in the 21st century - between 1998 and 2008, Inverness and the rest of the central Highlands showed the largest growth of average economic productivity per person in Scotland and the second-greatest growth in the United Kingdom as a whole, with an increase of 86%.

It was awarded the Nicholson Trophy (class 2 category) for the best town with between 20,000 and 50,000 inhabitants at Britain in Bloom contest in 1975.

Toponymy
Inverness and its immediate hinterland have a large number of originally Gaelic place names, as the area was solidly Gaelic-speaking until the late 19th century.

Several springs which were traditionally thought to have healing qualities exist around Inverness. Fuaran Dearg, which translates as the "Red Spring", is a chalybeate spring located near Dochgarroch. Fuaran a' Chladaich ("The Spring on the Beach") near Bunchrew was once accessed by a causeway from the shore. Although submerged at high tide it continues to bubble and was traditionally known for treating cholera. Fuaran Allt an Ionnlaid ("Well of the Washing Burn") at Clachnaharry, where the Marquis of Montrose was allowed to drink while on his way from his capture in Sutherland to his execution in Edinburgh, was known for treating skin conditions. Also at Clachnaharry, Fuaran Priseag ("The Precious Well") was said to have been blessed by Saint Kessock and could treat weak and sore eyes, as well as expelling evil and shielding curses if a silver coin was offered. Tobar na h-Oige ("Well of the Young") is located near Culloden and was known for curing all ailments. Fuaran a' Chragan Bhreag ("Well of the Speckled Rock") is located near Craig Dundain and Fuaran na Capaich ("The Keppoch Well") is located near Culloden.

Inverness is also home to the Munlochy Clootie Well.

Although a Gaelic name itself, Craig Phadraig is alternatively known as Làrach an Taigh Mhóir, or "the place of the Great house". "Several Gaelic place names are now largely obsolete due to the feature being removed or forgotten. Drochaid an Easain Duibh ("Bridge by the Small Dark Waterfall"), referred to in the tale Aonghas Mòr Thom na h-Iubhraich agus na Sìthichean ("Great Angus of Tomnahurich and the Fairies") has not yet been located within Inverness and Slag nam Mèirleach (meaning "Robbers' hollow"), adjacent to Dores Road in Holm is no longer in use. Until the late 19th century, four mussel beds existed on the delta mouth of the River Ness: Scalp Phàdraig Mhòir ("Scalp of Great Patrick"), Rònach ("Place of the Seals"), Cridhe an Uisge ("The Water Heart") and Scalp nan Caorach ("Scalp of the Sheep") – these mussel beds were all removed to allow better access for fishing boats and ships.

Allt Muineach (The Thicket River) now runs underground between Culcabock Roundabout and Millburn Roundabout. An Loch Gorm (The Turquoise Loch), a small sea loch which was situated beside Morrisons supermarket, was filled in during the 19th century and lives on only in the name of Lochgorm Warehouse. Abban Street stems from the word àban, a word of local Gaelic dialect meaning a small channel of water.

Many prominent points around Inverness retain fully Gaelic names.

 Beinn Bhuidhe Bheag – "Little Yellow Hill"
 Beinn Uan – "Lamb Hill"
 Cnoc na Mòine – "The Peat Hill"
 Cnoc na Gaoithe – "The Hill of the Wind"
 Cnoc an t-Seòmair – "The Hill of the Room"
 Creag Liath – "Grey Crag"
 Creag nan Sidhean – "The Crag of the Fairies"
 Doire Mhòr – "Great Oakwood"
 Carn a' Bhodaich – "The Old Man's Cairn"
 Meall Mòr – "Great Hill"

In the colonial period, a Gaelic-speaking settlement named New Inverness was established in McIntosh County, Georgia, by settlers from in and around Inverness. The name was also given by expatriates to settlements in Quebec, Nova Scotia, Montana, Florida, Illinois, and California. The name Inverness is also given to a feature on Miranda, a moon of the planet Uranus, as well as a 2637 m tall mountain in British Columbia, Canada. Inverness is also known by its nicknames Inversnecky or The Sneck, with its inhabitants traditionally known as Clann Na Cloiche ("Children of the Stone" in Gaelic) owing to the importance of the Clach Na Cudainn stone in the city's history.

Population

The National Records of Scotland define Inverness as the urban area west of the A9. To produce a greater Inverness figure including the villages of Balloch, Culloden, Smithton, and Westhill, it is necessary to aggregate NRS figures for each locality.

Geography

Inverness is situated at the mouth of the River Ness (which flows from nearby Loch Ness) and at the south-western extremity of the Moray Firth. The city lies at the end of the Great Glen with Loch Ness, Loch Ashie and Loch Duntelchaig to the west. Inverness's Caledonian Canal also runs through the Great Glen, connecting Loch Ness, Loch Oich, and Loch Lochy.

The Ness Islands, a publicly owned park, consists of two wooded islands connected by footbridges and has been used as a place of recreation since the 1840s. Craig Phadraig, once an ancient Gaelic and Pictish hillfort, is a  hill which offers hikes on a clear pathway through the wooded terrain.

Inverness lies on the Great Glen Fault. There are minor earthquakes, usually unnoticed by locals, about every 3 years. The last earthquake to affect Inverness was in 1934.

Location

Climate
Like most of the United Kingdom, Inverness has an oceanic climate (Köppen: Cfb). The climate here is cooler than in more southerly parts of Britain. The climate in this area is characterised by relatively small differences between annual high and low temperatures, as well as adequate rainfall year-round.

Health

Raigmore Hospital is the main hospital in Inverness and the entire Highland region. The present hospital opened in 1970, replacing wartime wards dating from 1941.

Raigmore is a teaching hospital for the universities of Aberdeen and Stirling. A Centre for Health Science (CfHS) is located behind the hospital. This is funded by Highlands and Islands Enterprise, the Scottish Government and Johnson & Johnson. Phase I of this opened in early 2007, with phase II and phase III housing The Diabetes Institute opening in 2009. The University of Stirling moved its nursing and midwifery teaching operations from Raigmore Hospital to the CfHS. The University of the Highlands and Islands also has strong links with the Centre through its Faculty of Health.

Economy

Most of the traditional industries such as distilling have been replaced by high-tech businesses, such as the design and manufacture of diabetes diagnostic kits (by LifeScan). Highlands and Islands Enterprise has principally funded the Centre for Health Science to attract more businesses in the medical and medical devices business to the area. Inverness is home to Scottish Natural Heritage following that body's relocation from Edinburgh under the auspices of the Scottish Government's decentralisation strategy. SNH provides a large number of jobs in the area.

City centre
Inverness City Centre lies on the east bank of the river and is linked to the west side of the town by three road bridges – Ness Bridge, Friars Bridge and the Black (or Waterloo) Bridge – and by one of the town's suspension foot bridges, the Greig Street Bridge. The traditional city centre was a triangle bounded by High Street, Church Street and Academy Street, within which Union Street and Queensgate are cross streets parallel to High Street. Between Union Street and Queensgate is the Victorian Market, which contains a large number of small shops. The main Inverness railway station is almost directly opposite the Academy Street entrance to the Market. From the 1970s, the Eastgate Shopping Centre was developed to the east of High Street, with a substantial extension being completed in 2003.

Education

The city has a number of different education providers. Inverness is catered for by about a dozen primary schools including Bun-sgoil Ghàidhlig Inbhir Nis, a specialised institution situated at Slackbuie.  There are five secondary schools: Inverness High School, Inverness Royal Academy, Charleston Academy, Millburn Academy, and Culloden Academy.  Additionally there is Inverness College UHI which offers further and higher education courses to those of school leaving age and above. The city also has a new Centre for Health Sciences adjacent to Raigmore Hospital.

University of the Highlands and Islands

Inverness College is situated in the city and is a part of the University of the Highlands and Islands, a federation of 15 colleges and research institutions in the Highlands and Islands of Scotland delivering higher education. With around 8,420 students, Inverness College hosts around a quarter of all the University of the Highlands and Islands' students, and 30% of those studying to degree level.

In 2015 the college moved to a new campus to the East of the A9.  The original outline planning application forms a vision for the development over the next thirty years. The application includes:

Academic buildings – up to 70,480 m2
Business and incubation units – up to 49,500 m2
Indoor sports complex – up to 9,000 m2
Student and other short term residences – 44,950 m2
Associated landscape, open space, outdoor recreation, infrastructure and services necessary to support the development phases
Up to 200 residential units
A social enterprise-run hotel

The  campus at Beechwood, just off the A9 east of Inverness, is considered to be one of the most important developments for the region over the next 20 years. The principal of UHI, James Fraser, said: "This is a flagship development which will provide Inverness with a university campus and vibrant student life. It will have a major impact on the city and on the Highlands and Islands. UHI is a partnership of colleges and research centres throughout the region, and the development of any one partner brings strength to the whole institution."

It is estimated that the new campus would contribute more than £50m to the economy of the Highlands because it could attract innovative commercial businesses interested in research and development, while increasing the number of students who study within the city by around 3,000.

Transport

Road 
Inverness is linked to the Black Isle across the Moray Firth by the Kessock Bridge.

Three trunk roads link Inverness with the rest of Scotland:

 A9 north to Thurso and Wick, and south to Perth (carrying European Route E15) and the Central Belt,
 A82 to Glasgow via Fort William
 A96 to Elgin and Aberdeen.

Inverness Trunk Road Link

Plans are in place to convert the A96 between Inverness and Nairn to a dual carriageway and to construct a southern bypass that would link the A9, A82 and A96 together involving crossings of the Caledonian Canal and the River Ness in the Torvean area, southwest of the town.

The bypass, known as the Inverness Trunk Road Link (TRL), is aimed at resolving Inverness's transport problems and has been split into two separate projects, the east and west sections.

In late 2008 the controversial decision by the Scottish Government not to include the full Inverness bypass in its transport plan for the next 20 years was made. The government's Strategic Transport Projects Review did include the eastern section of the route, which will see the A9 at Inshes linked to the A96.

But the absence of the TRL's western section, which would include a permanent crossing over the Caledonian Canal and River Ness, sparked dismay among several Highland councillors and business leaders in Inverness who feel the bypass is vital for the city's future economic growth. Ultimately both sections received funding from the Inverness and Highland city-region deal. The eastern section now also includes a commitment to upgrade the Longman Roundabout to a grade separated interchange.

East section 
The east section will bypass Inshes Roundabout, a notorious traffic bottleneck, using a new road linking the existing Southern Distributor with the A9 and the A96, both via grade separated interchanges. This proposed new link road would separate strategic traffic from local traffic. It will also accommodate the proposed developments at:

 Inverness Shopping Park
 West Seafield Business Park 
 Inverness Campus
 Housing developments at Ashton Farm, Stratton and Culloden West.

An indicative timescale for completion of this section is the dualling of the A96 from Inverness to Nairn.

West Section 
The west section is intended to provide an alternate route connecting the A9 with the A82. This will bypass the city centre by providing additional crossings of the River Ness and Caledonian Canal.

At the west end, two options for crossing the River Ness and Caledonian Canal were developed. One involving a high level vertical opening bridge which will allow the majority of canal traffic to pass under without the need for opening. The other involved a bridge over the river and an aqueduct under the canal. Both of these designs are technically complex and were considered in detail along by the key stakeholders involved in the project.

Ultimately it was decided that a bridge would be constructed over the River Ness and a second swing bridge be constructed over the Caledonian Canal. This second swing bridge would operate in tandem with the current swing bridge enabling a constant flow of traffic. The works started on site on the 10 June 2019 and include a roundabout, realignment of General Booth Road onto the A82, and a second bridge across the Caledonian Canal.

The works were programmed to be complete in December 2020. However, due to a number of construction delays the section was opened in August 2021.

Upgrading of the A9 Perth to Inverness

In late 2008 the Scottish Government's transport plan for the next 20 years was announced. It brings forward planned improvements to the A9 in an attempt to stimulate the economy and protect jobs.

Work costing a total of £8.5 million was undertaken at Moy, Carrbridge, and Bankfoot. Northbound overtaking lanes were created and the carriageway was reconstructed at both Moy and Carrbridge. Junction improvements were also made at Moy.

In November 2011 the Scottish Government announced that it will upgrade the entire road from Perth to Inverness to dual carriageway. Work on this project is expected to start in 2015 is scheduled to be completed in 2025, at a cost of £3 billion.

In July 2013, the Scottish Government announced a plan to install average speed cameras on the A9 between Perth and Inverness. This has been undertaken with an aim to reduce accidents and fatalities on the road, and will be the second permanent average speed camera scheme in Scotland.

As of October 2021, 2 sections of the upgraded route have been opened. In August 2021 the procurement process for the Tomatin to Moy section was started. Once this section is completed, there will be 20 miles (32 km) of continuous dual carriageway south of Inverness.

Upgrading of the A96 Inverness to Aberdeen 
In December 2011, The Scottish Government announced its intention to dual the A96 between Inverness and Aberdeen. The project will include upgrading the remaining 86 miles (138 km) of single carriageway along the route to dual carriageway at a cost of £3 billion.

The first section to be dualled will be the section between Inverness and Auldearn. This will include a bypass of Nairn and the construction of a number of grade separated interchanges along the route.

Public Transport

Bus

Inverness bus station is situated at Farraline Park and can be accessed from Academy Street and Margaret Street. The bus station is managed by The Highland Council and is a short walk away from the Inverness railway station and the main shopping area.

Permission was granted to demolish the existing bus station in 2000. It was then replaced with a new terminal building in the early 2000s.

The bus station's main operators include Stagecoach in Inverness and Stagecoach in Lochaber. Buses operate from the bus station around the town of Inverness and to Inverness Airport and to places as far afield as Fort William, Ullapool, Thurso, and Aberdeen.

Megabus and Scottish Citylink operate a regular coach service to the Scotland's capital Edinburgh with connections to Glasgow at Perth.

National Express Coaches operate an overnight service from Inverness to London (Victoria) via Edinburgh taking 15 hours 5 minutes.

Stagecoach Highlands is the division of the Stagecoach Group which covers most of the former Rapson Group operations after the take-over by Stagecoach.
It covers the following depots of the Stagecoach Group.

Fort William (Ardgour Road, Caol) (t/a Stagecoach in Lochaber)
Kirkwall (Scott's Road Hatston Industrial Estate) (t/a Stagecoach in Orkney)
Portree (Park Road) (t/a Stagecoach in Skye)
Thurso (Janet Street) (t/a Stagecoach in Caithness)

There are various outstations over the division area due to the rural nature of the area covered.

The operation from Aviemore depot comes under the East Scotland division as it trades as Stagecoach in Inverness.

Rail 
ScotRail services connect Inverness railway station to Perth, Edinburgh, Glasgow, Aberdeen, Thurso, Wick, and Kyle of Lochalsh. Inverness is connected to London Euston by the Caledonian Sleeper, which departs six times a week and by the London North Eastern Railway operated Highland Chieftain to London King's Cross which runs daily.

Port of Inverness
The Port of Inverness is located at the mouth of the River Ness. It has four quays and receives over 300 vessels a year.

Inverness Airport
Loganair operate Saab 340 and Saab 2000 aircraft on routes to Benbecula, Dublin, Kirkwall, Stornoway, and Sumburgh. EasyJet operate Airbus aircraft to London Gatwick three times per day, Luton twice a day and Bristol. British Airways operates a daily service to London Heathrow, and KLM operate a daily service to Amsterdam.

Government

Local government

Inverness was an autonomous royal burgh, and county town for the county of Inverness (also known as Inverness-shire) until 1975, when local government counties and burghs were abolished, under the Local Government (Scotland) Act 1973, in favour of two-tier regions and districts and unitary islands council areas. The royal burgh was then absorbed into a new district of Inverness, which was one of eight districts within The Highland Council region. The new district combined in one area the royal burgh, the Inverness district of the county and the Aird district of the county.  The rest of the county was divided between other new districts within the Highland region and the Western Isles. Therefore, although much larger than the royal burgh, the new Inverness district was much smaller than the county.

In 1996, under the Local Government etc (Scotland) Act 1994, the districts were abolished and the region became a unitary council area. The new unitary The Highland Council, however, adopted the areas of the former districts as council management areas, and created area committees to represent each. The Inverness committee represented 23 out of the 80 Highland Council wards, with each ward electing one councillor by the first past the post system of election. Management area and committee area boundaries later became disconnected as a result of changes to ward boundaries in 1999. Ward boundaries changed again in 2007, and the council management areas were replaced with three new corporate management areas.

Ward boundary changes in 2007, under the Local Governance (Scotland) Act 2004, created 22 new Highland Council wards, each electing three or four councillors by the single transferable vote system of election, a system designed to produce a form of proportional representation. The total number of councillors remaining the same. Also, the Inverness management area was merged into the new Inverness, Nairn and Badenoch and Strathspey corporate management area, covering nine of the new wards and electing 34 of the 80 councillors. As well as the Inverness area, the new area includes the former Nairn management area and the former Badenoch and Strathspey management area. The corporate area name is also that of a constituency, but boundaries are different.

Within the corporate area there is a city management area covering seven of the nine wards, the Aird and Loch Ness ward, the Culloden and Ardersier ward, the Inverness Central ward, the Inverness Millburn ward, the Inverness Ness-side ward, the Inverness South ward and the Inverness West ward. The Nairn and Cawdor ward and the Badenoch and Strathspey ward complete the corporate area. Wards in the city management area are to be represented on a city committee as well as corporate area committees.

City status
In 2001, city status was granted to the Town of Inverness, and letters patent were taken into the possession of the Highland Council by the convener of the Inverness area committee. These letters patent, which were sealed in March 2001 and are held by Inverness Museum and Art Gallery, create a city of Inverness, but do not refer to anywhere with defined boundaries, except that Town of Inverness may be taken as a reference to the burgh of Inverness. As a local government area the burgh was abolished 26 years earlier, in 1975, and so was the county of Inverness for which the burgh was the county town.  Nor do they refer to the former district or to the royal burgh.

The Highland area was created as a two-tier local government region in 1975, and became a unitary local government area in 1996. The region consisted of eight districts, of which one was called Inverness. The districts were all merged into the unitary area. As the new local government authority, the Highland Council then adopted the areas of the districts as council management areas. The management areas were abolished in 2007, in favour of three new corporate management areas. The council has defined a large part of the Inverness, Nairn and Badenoch and Strathspey corporate area as the Inverness city management area. This council-defined city area includes Loch Ness and numerous towns and villages apart from the former burgh of Inverness.

In January 2008 a petition to matriculate armorial bearings for the City of Inverness was refused by Lord Lyon King of Arms on the grounds that there is no legal persona to which arms can be granted.

Parliamentary representation

There are two existing parliamentary constituencies with Inverness as an element in their names:
 One county constituency of the House of Commons of the Parliament of the United Kingdom (Westminster), created in 2005:
 Inverness, Nairn, Badenoch and Strathspey, currently represented by Scottish National Party (SNP) Member of Parliament (MP) Drew Hendry.
 One constituency of the Scottish Parliament (Holyrood), created in 2011:
 Inverness and Nairn, currently represented by Scottish National Party Member of the Scottish Parliament (MSP) Fergus Ewing

These existing constituencies are effectively subdivisions of the Highland council area, but boundaries for Westminster elections are now very different from those for Holyrood elections. The Holyrood constituencies are also subdivisions of the Highlands and Islands electoral region.

Historically there have been six Westminster constituencies:
 One burgh constituency:
 Inverness Burghs, 1708 to 1918
 Five county constituencies:
 Inverness-shire, 1708 to 1918
 Inverness, 1918 to 1983
 Inverness, Nairn and Lochaber, 1983 to 1997
 Inverness East, Nairn and Lochaber, 1997 to 2005
 Ross, Skye and Inverness West, 1997 to 2005

Inverness Burghs was a district of burghs constituency, covering the parliamentary burghs of Inverness, Fortrose, Forres, and Nairn. Inverness-shire covered, at least nominally, the county of Inverness minus the Inverness parliamentary burgh. As created in 1918, Inverness covered the county minus Outer Hebridean areas, which were merged into the Western Isles constituency. The Inverness constituency included the former parliamentary burgh of Inverness. As created in 1983, Inverness, Nairn and Lochaber was one of three constituencies covering the Highland region, which had been created in 1975. As first used in 1997, the Inverness East, Nairn and Lochaber, and Ross, Skye and Inverness West constituencies were effectively two of three constituencies covering the Highland unitary council area, which had been created in 1996.

Association with Prince Andrew
Prince Andrew, Duke of York is known by the title "Earl of Inverness." In 2019 Inverness residents started a campaign to strip him of that title, stating that "it is inappropriate that Prince Andrew is associated with our beautiful city."

Twin towns – sister cities

Inverness is twinned with:
  Augsburg, Germany (1956)
  La Baule-Escoublac, France (1981)
  Saint-Valery-en-Caux, France (1987)

Culture

 The main theatre, cinema and arts centre in Inverness is called  Eden Court Theatre. Other venues in the city include Inverness Museum and Art Gallery, The Iron Works, The Norther Meeting Park and Wasp Studios. 

Inverness is an important centre for bagpipe players and lovers, since every September the city hosts the Northern Meeting. The Inverness cape, a garment worn in the rain by pipers the world over, is not necessarily made in Inverness.

Another major event in calendar is the annual City of Inverness Highland Games. The event can trace its roots back to one of the first Highland Games staged in the modern era; the True Highland Games which was staged in 1822 by members of the Northern Meeting Society. In 1864 the Northern Meeting Society built the world's first Highland Games stadium, the Northern Meeting Park. The last Northern Meeting Highland Games was staged in 1938 and following the second world war, responsibility for the organisation of the annual event passed to the Town Council who moved the event to Bught Park in 1948. In 2006 Inverness hosted Scotland's biggest ever Highland Games over two days in July, featuring the Masters' World Championships, the showcase event for heavies aged over 40 years. The first year that the Masters' World Championships had been held outside the United States was 2006, and it attracted many top heavies from around the world to the Inverness area. The Masters World Championships returned in 2009 when it was staged as part of the Homecoming celebrations. In 2010, the City of Inverness Highland Games returned to Northern Meeting Park where it remains to this day.

Actress Karen Gillan is the ambassador for Theatre Art Education. 

Inverness has gained notoriety as well for being featured in the Outlander novel series by author Diana Gabaldon.

The Tartan Heart Festival in the nearby village of Kiltarlity, is a summer festival that brings a variety of music to the area.

BFBS Radio broadcasts on 87.7FM as part of its UK Bases network.

Inverness Botanic Gardens is located in Bught Park a few minutes walk from the west bank of the River Ness near to the Ness Islands.

In 2007, the city hosted Highland 2007, a celebration of the culture of the Highlands, and will also host the World Highland Games Heavy Championships (21 & 22 July) and European Pipe Band Championships (28 July). 2008 saw the first Hi-Ex (Highlands International Comics Expo), held at the Eden Court Theatre.

Inverness is the location of Macbeth's castle in Shakespeare's play.

Inverness Library is located in Farraline Park, housed in what was originally the Bell's school, designed by William Robertson in the Greek Revival style.  The school was built with help from a £10,000 donation from Dr Andrew Bell in 1837.

Scottish Gaelic in Inverness

Historically, Inverness had a solidly Scottish Gaelic speaking population, with the majority of the population having Gaelic as their first language. From approximately the end of the 19th century, following the 1872 Education Act, Inverness suffered a decline in the number of Gaelic speakers in line with the rest of the once Gaidhealtachd / Scottish Highlands. Despite the local dialect of Scottish Gaelic gradually falling out of use (although it continued to affect local English language dialect), the language is still spoken in other dialects and standardised forms. By the end of the 19th century, some rural areas to the south east of Inverness still had completely Gaelic speaking populations, such as Strath Dearn where almost 100% of the population were still Gaelic speaking.

1677: Inverness was described as "overwhelmingly" Gaelic speaking by the traveller Thomas Kirk.

1704: Close to 100% of the population was fluent in Gaelic with over 75% of the population only able to speak Gaelic. Edward Lhuyd published major work on Inverness Gaelic and after collecting data from between 1699 and 1700, his findings showed a distinct dialect in the area. The clear dialect of Inverness Gaelic was held in high regard by speakers of other forms, such as those from Lewis, Sutherland and Ross. Gaelic remained the principal language of Invernessians for the rest of the 18th century, despite growing pressure from outwith the Highlands in both political and social contexts.

1798: Thomas Garnett (Professor of Natural Philosophy and Chemistry in the Royal Institution of Great Britain) observed that Inverness had become largely bilingual with Invernessians using Gaelic as the language of the home but English as the language of foreign trade – however, the older generation at the time generally only had the Gaelic. Speaking of those in the countryside immediately surrounding Inverness, Garnett stated that although in Inverness both Gaelic and English "are spoken promiscuously...the language of the country people is Gaelic."

1828: John Wood praised the standard of both the Gaelic and English spoken in Inverness stating that both languages were spoken with "utmost purity." He noted that children would casually flit between the two languages while playing, asking questions in Gaelic while receiving answers in English and vice versa.

1882: The Celtic Magazine, published in Inverness, complained that enumerators of the 1881 census who assessed whether families were Gaelic speaking, English speaking or both, had supplied false information. The magazine wrote that "whole families .... scarcely any member of whom can express the commonest idea intelligently in English – who are in every sense Gaelic-speaking people only – were returned by the enumerators as English-speaking."

1901: Inhabitants of Inverness voiced regret at the very swift decay of the native language in the short space of twenty years following a complete absence of bilingual education and disregard for Gaelic.

For its size, Inverness today still has a relatively high density of Gaelic speakers and a relatively lively Gaelic scene, making it one of the centres of the Scottish Gaelic Renaissance. According to the 2011 census, 4.8% of residents of greater Inverness over age 3 speak Gaelic compared to 1.1% nationally.  At 2,800 Gaelic speakers, only Greater Glasgow and Edinburgh have a higher absolute total. The number of Gaelic speakers has fluctuated over the last century. In 1881, the census reported 4,047 Gaelic speakers in Inverness (23.3% of the population) which by 1891 had risen to 6,356 speakers (30.47%). By 1901 this figure had dropped to 5,072 speakers (23.88%) of the population, from which it continued to drop to present day numbers through emigration and language shift. Scottish Gaelic is slowly re-appearing in the linguistic landscape, appearing on some signs around Inverness. Bun-sgoil Ghàidhlig Inbhir Nis, which opened in August 2007 offering primary school education through the medium of Gaelic, is nearing full capacity and was extended to allow for more pupils in August 2010. Bòrd na Gàidhlig, an organisation responsible for supporting and promoting the use of Scottish Gaelic, has its main office in Inverness. Other Gaelic related groups include the Inverness Gaelic Choir which has existed for over 70 years. Inverness also hosted the Royal National Mòd in 2014, a festival celebrating Gaelic culture.

Cityscape

Important buildings in Inverness include Inverness Castle, and various churches.

The castle was built in 1835 on the site of its medieval predecessor. Until 30 March 2020, it housed Inverness Sheriff Court: this has now been moved to the Inverness Justice Centre.

Inverness Cathedral, dedicated to St Andrew, is a cathedral of the Scottish Episcopal Church and seat of the ordinary of the Diocese of Moray, Ross and Caithness. The cathedral has a curiously square-topped look to its spires, as funds ran out before they could be completed.

The oldest church is the Old High Church, on St Michael's Mount by the riverside, a site perhaps used for worship since Celtic times. The church tower dates from mediaeval times, making it the oldest surviving building in Inverness. It is used by the Church of Scotland congregation of Old High St Stephen's, Inverness, and it is the venue for the annual Kirking of the council, which is attended by local councillors.

There is no Catholic cathedral in the area as the Diocese's cathedral (St Mary) is at Aberdeen, the seat of the Diocese of Aberdeen. The Catholic population is served by two parish churches: St Mary's, Inverness founded in 1837, is the older of the two and the first Catholic church founded in Inverness since the Reformation. St Ninian's was built during the 1960s and 1970s.

Porterfield Prison, officially HMP Inverness, serves the courts of the Highlands, Western Isles, Orkney Isles and Moray, providing secure custody for all remand prisoners and short-term adult prisoners, both male and female, who are segregated.

Long-distance walking hub

Inverness is connected to three long-distance footpaths:
 The Great Glen Way – connects to Fort William along the Great Glen
 The John o' Groats Trail – connects to John o' Groats along the coast
 The South Loch Ness Trail – connects to Fort Augustus along the southeast side of Loch Ness

Sport

The city is home to four football clubs that are recognised in the SFA Pyramid, though two are part of a league that hasn't been fully incorporated. Inverness Caledonian Thistle was formed in 1994 from the merger of two Highland League clubs, Caledonian and Inverness Thistle. "Caley Thistle" of the Scottish Championship plays at the Tulloch Caledonian Stadium, and have proven themselves to be the dominant team in the highlands after winning the Scottish Cup and participating in the Europa League in 2015, as well as many giant killings. The city's second football club, Clachnacuddin, plays in the Highland League. Inverness Athletic became the third, joining the North Caledonian Football League in 2016, with Loch Ness, becoming the 4th in 2020, after stepping up from Amateur Football. Inverness Citadel was another popular side which became defunct, but had its name revived. Inverness City played in the North Region Juniors and were formed in 2006, but folded in 2019.

Highland RFC is the local rugby union club that competes in the Scottish National League Division One. It has enjoyed recent promotions in the past several years and continues to be a hub for rugby in the North of Scotland.

Shinty is an integral part of the Highlands and Islands. As the capital of the Highlands, Camanachd Association is based in Inverness and the city often hosts a wealth of Shinty finals such as the Camanachd Cup Final (the pinnacle of Shinty) as well as the international game of Shinty and Irish hurling. Despite Inverness Shinty Club not being particularly successful in recent years, some of the towns and villages that surround the city have been, such as Kiltarlity who are the home of Lovat Shinty Club (recent winners of the MacTavish Cup 2013) and Glen Urquhart.

Highland HC is the local hockey team, it consists of two men's teams, two ladies teams and a junior team. with both Men's & Ladies' 1st teams in Scottish National Division 2. The Men's 1st team successfully gained promotion from Scottish National Division 3 in 2011.

Inverness Blitz is a charity that promotes the development of American football in Inverness and the surrounding area. Bught Park, located in the centre of Inverness is the finishing point of the annual Loch Ness Marathon and home of Inverness Shinty Club.

In 2011, Inverness hosted professional golf with the Scottish Open on the European Tour, played at Castle Stuart the week before The Open Championship.

Cricket is also played in Inverness, with both Highland CC and Northern Counties playing in the North of Scotland Cricket Association League and 7 welfare league teams playing midweek cricket at Fraser Park. Both teams have been very successful over the years.

Stock car racing was staged in Inverness circa 1973.

Inverness has a mixed basketball team, the Inverness Giants, who play exhibition games against local teams throughout the North and Islands.

Notable people

Laura Muir – World champion runner
Charlie Christie – Footballer; career included playing for Celtic and Inverness Caledonian Thistle
Charles Fraser Mackintosh (Teàrlach Friseal Mac An Toisich) – lawyer, author and politician. Born and raised in Inverness and represented the Highlands in Westminster.
Yvette Cooper – former Secretary of State for Work and Pensions was born in Inverness
Don Cowie – Footballer, who formerly played for several clubs including Heart of Midlothian
Huntley Duff, cricketer
Janet Barlow, scientist
James Alexander Forbes – British Vice-Consul to Mexican California as well as the first British Consul to the American state of California
Jamie Gillan – American football player for the NFL Cleveland Browns
Karen Gillan – Actress, best known as Amy Pond, the Doctor's Companion in Doctor Who and as Nebula in the Guardians of the Galaxy series of the Marvel Cinematic Universe.
Donald McBane - Swordsman and author
Elspet Gray – Actress
Murray Grigor – Scottish film-maker
Derry Irvine – Former Lord Chancellor (under Tony Blair), former Labour Prime Minister; was born in Inverness
Malcolm Jones – Musician; guitar player for Runrig
Charles Kennedy – Former leader of the Liberal Democrats; was born in Inverness
Russell Knox – Scottish professional golfer who plays on the PGA Tour
Kevin MacDonald – Former footballer who played for Liverpool F.C., and former caretaker first team coach at Aston Villa
John A. Mackay – Presbyterian theologian, missionary, and educator
Mary Macpherson – (Màiri Nic a' Phearsain) poet and political activist, "Great Mairi of the Songs" raised her children in Inverness, where she wrote much of her work.
John McGinlay – Former footballer who played as a striker, most notably for Bolton Wanderers
Very Rev Mitford Mitchell DD Moderator of the General Assembly of the Church of Scotland in 1903
Ethel Moir – Nursing orderly with Scottish Women's Hospitals for Foreign Service
Ali Smith – Author; born in Inverness in 1962
James Sutherland (b. 1881) – football player at the turn of the century, with Caledonian and Burnley
Mr Egg – MacAcidhouse musician; born in Inverness on 7 January 1959
Lily Henderson – Youth Climate Activist; raised in Inverness  
Major General Douglas Wimberley—British Army officer, born in Inverness 16 August 1896, service in World War I and World War II
Josephine Tey – Author; born in Inverness in 1896
Connie Ramsay (born 1988), judoka
Jenny Graham - Set the world record for the fastest woman to cycle around the world

References

External links

 The Inverness Courier

 
Clan Fraser
County towns in Scotland
Cities in Scotland
Port cities and towns in Scotland
Port cities and towns of the North Sea
Populated places in Inverness committee area